V Kamaruddin, popularly known as Kamaruddin is an Indian cricketer, who has played 64 first-class matches between 1993 and 2002 for Kerala. Kamaruddin played as the wicketkeeper and has scored only a 50 plus score as a batsman. Kamaruddin has effected six dismissals – four caught and two stumpings – in Hyderabad's first innings of 1996'97 Ranji Trophy match, thus became the 16th wicket keeper effecting six or more dismissals in Ranji Trophy match.

References

External links
 

  
1972 births
Living people
Kerala cricketers
Indian cricketers
South Zone cricketers
Cricketers from Palakkad